is a fictional antiheroine character and the female protagonist in Capcom's Darkstalkers series. Having debuted in 1994's Darkstalkers: The Night Warriors, she has since appeared in every game in the series and in various related media and merchandise, as well as in multiple video games outside the Darkstalkers line, including most entries in both Marvel vs. Capcom and SNK vs. Capcom. 

Morrigan is a succubus and a powerful princess (later queen) of the demon realm Makai, who is very vain and lives for little more than  the excitement of battle, but slowly begins to take her royal responsibilities more seriously despite her obsessive fascination with the souls of human men. She has a sister-like split part named Lilith and a rival named Demitri Maximoff, and her moveset is reminiscent of Ryu and Ken from Street Fighter.

Appearances

Video games

Darkstalkers games
In the Darkstalkers series, Morrigan is a succubus and the adopted daughter of the demon king Belial of the Aensland House, one of the three major houses of Makai (魔界, lit. "Demon World"), who prophesied her birth in Scotland in the year 1678. Belial also foresaw the dangers of the incredible power residing in Morrigan. If she could not properly control her power, it would consume her body and the world would suffer catastrophic damage. To prevent this event from unfolding, Belial sealed two thirds of her soul away until she was able to endure her full power. One third was sealed within himself, to return to Morrigan upon his death; the other one third was sealed within a pocket dimension that eventually became a being of its own, named Lilith. Unaware of Belial's action, Morrigan grew up, tended after by two lesser demons named Lucien and Mudo. She found her life as a sheltered princess in the Aensland castle dull, so she frequently visited the human world to look for entertainment, tempting humans regardless of their sex and fighting for her own pleasure. She is capable of crossing into the human dimension without the use of the gates but simply relying on her own translocation ability.

Centuries later, during the events of Darkstalkers: The Night Warriors (Vampire) and Night Warriors: Darkstalkers' Revenge (Vampire Hunter), Morrigan is drawn to a strange immense power (which would turn out to be the alien fire demon Pyron) and ventures into the human world once again. Morrigan finds and challenges Pyron to battle, but is defeated, as he turns out to be too strong for her to beat. Instead, victory goes to the banished vampire lord Demitri Maximoff, her father's sworn enemy, who absorbs Pyron's power. Sixteen years later, Belial passes away and Morrigan is informed she is the successor to the Aensland throne to rule for next 1,200 years. Although she becomes rightfully the ruler of Makai as Queen of the Night, Morrigan still shirks her responsibilities and seeks to continue her hedonistic and thrill-seeking life as before. Meanwhile, Demitri has returned to Makai shortly after learning of Belial's death and challenges Morrigan for the right to rule the demon realm. Morrigan gradually accepted the insistent vampire's demand prior to the events of Darkstalkers 3 (Vampire Savior), with Jedah Dohma appearing after his century-long nap and creating the Majigen which sucked Morrigan and her castle into it. Jedah freed Lilith, who is compelled to find Morrigan, eventually merging back into her as depicted in both their endings.

Other games
Morrigan was the first Darkstalkers character to break-out of the original fighting game series and cross over into the Marvel vs. Capcom series. In Marvel vs. Capcom: Clash of Super Heroes (1998, remade as Marvel vs. Capcom Origins in 2012), not only was Morrigan present, but an alternate "Lilith-style" Morrigan was a secret character; in her intro cutscene, Lilith appears and merges with her in a nod to when the two merged in Morrigan's ending in Vampire Savior. In Marvel vs. Capcom 2: New Age of Heroes (2000), she is joined by fellow Darkstalkers characters Anakaris, B.B. Hood and Felicia. She was later accompanied by Felicia and Hsien-Ko for Marvel vs. Capcom 3: Fate of Two Worlds (2011), Ultimate Marvel vs. Capcom 3 (2011), and Marvel vs. Capcom: Infinite (2017); in Marvel vs. Capcom 3, Morrigan's rival is Iron Man. She is the playable sole representative in Tatsunoko Production universe crossovers Tatsunoko vs. Capcom: Cross Generation of Heroes (2008) and Tatsunoko vs. Capcom: Ultimate All-Stars (2010). Morrigan also acts as the sole playable representative of the Darkstalkers series in the SNK vs. Capcom series' entries Capcom vs. SNK: Millennium Fight 2000 and Capcom vs. SNK 2: Mark of the Millennium 2001; she was joined by Felicia and B.B. Hood for SNK vs. Capcom: The Match of the Millennium (1999).

Morrigan has also represented Darkstalkers in non-fighting games, appearing in the crossover tactical role-playing game Namco × Capcom (2005) and the multi-company crossover tactical role-playing games Cross Edge (2008), Project X Zone (2012), and Project X Zone 2 (2015), in all cases appearing with other Darkstalkers personalities, as well as in puzzle games Super Puzzle Fighter II Turbo (1996), Street Fighter Puzzle Spirits (2015), and Puzzle Fighter (2017), in a fighting game Super Gem Fighter Mini Mix / Pocket Fighter (1997), in card games SNK vs. Capcom: Card Fighters Clash (1999) and Street Fighter × All Capcom (2013), in a mobile game Street Fighter Battle Combination (2015), and in a browser-based social card game Onimusha Soul (2014). With all of her appearances in Capcom crossover projects, Morrigan is the single most common Darkstalkers cast member to appear outside of the origin series.

Morrigan is a playable guest character in the Sega Dreamcast port of Psikyo's shoot 'em up game Gunbird 2 (2000), in the North American version of We Love Golf! (2008), and in the Japanese version of action role-playing video game Monster Hunter Frontier (2011). Furthermore, she has her own mobile game, titled , and made cameo appearances in games such as Street Fighter Alpha 2, Capcom Fighting Evolution, and Scott Pilgrim vs. the World: The Game. Her collaboration guest appearances in mobile social games have included Samurai Kingdom and The Knights of Avalon among others, and her costume can be worn by Chun-Li in Street Fighter V and by Frank West in action-adventure game Dead Rising 4.

Character design and portrayal
Morrigan usually appears as a beautiful young woman with long sea-green hair, usually wearing a sleeveless black bustier-like top adorned with white feathers and a small heart cut out of the midriff; purple nylons emblazoned with bat patterns; black boots; and conspicuous batlike wings protruding from her back and the sides of her head. She can reshape these wings and her limbs into many forms, including spikes, blades and drills, or even into a jet pack or a handheld laser cannon, as well as using them to shield herself from enemy attacks. Her wings can separate from her, forming into an army of bats that can aid her in battle, and her outfit itself is actually made of a swarm of supernatural bats too. She is also able to teleport, to fire blasts of magical energy, and to split herself into two different mirror images that remain her physical forms until joined into one again. Her human form is similar, but wingless and sometimes with blonde and not green hair. Morrigan is somewhat bisexual, likes to prey on stolen dreams and life essences of sleeping humans, and just a kiss can be enough for Morrigan to completely drain energy from her victims. Morrigan is 172 cm tall, weighs 58 kg, and her measurements are 86–56–83; she often speaks in sexually suggestive double entendres and flirts more with males than females. Her relationship with Demitri is far from being just antagonistic, and might one day lead to an end of the feud between their houses.

[[File:Morrigan Aensland concept.png|thumb|300px|left|Concept art pictures showing several design ideas for the character prior to Morrigan's introduction in Darkstalkers: The Night Warriors. Her designer also created Street Fighter's Sagat and Cammy]]

Early in the development of Darkstalkers: The Night Warriors, the team decided to have two female characters: a catwoman and a female vampire, characters who would become Felicia and Morrigan, respectively. Initially, Felicia was intended to be the "sexy" female character of the title, while the vampire would be the "cute" female character. However, Morrigan's design took on a tone that emphasized sexiness, causing Felicia's character concept to be altered accordingly. The Japanese designers began developing the plot of Darkstalkers from the very simple stories of only Morrigan and Demitri, whose names have been suggested by the overseas staff for a properly aristocratic feel; their relationship formed the base that was then fleshed out from there. Morrigan's character was originally envisioned as a female vampire; her design was highly masculine, inspired by Go Nagai's Devilman Lady. However Darkstalkers creator, Capcom USA producer Alex Jimenez, changed her into a succubus because they already had a vampire, Demitri, in the game. Morrigan's role in the game was to be similar to this of Chun-Li in Capcom's own Street Fighter series of fighting games. Her costume mirrors "her personality: somewhere between a batlike demon and a charming lover." Kotaku called her one of Capcom's "least-dressed female characters" and "one of the most fan servicey".

Morrigan's character has been voiced in most games by Yayoi Jinguji until 2011, when the role was taken over by Rie Tanaka. Morrigan's English voice was provided by Erin Fitzgerald for Cross Edge and by Siobhan Flynn for Marvel vs. Capcom 3 and its update. In most of her appearance, Morrigan has had exactly the same 2D sprite set as far as Capcom vs. SNK 2 (2001) as she did in the original Darkstalkers game (1994). As such, Morrigan was featured in Guinness World Records Gamer's Edition as "Most reused character sprite in a fighting game" for her 10 appearances between 1994 and 2001. Her sprites look especially poorGamesTM 3, page 115. and out of place in the Capcom vs. SNK where they got visibly pixelated and gained a black outline. She received an updated character model in 2008's Tatsunoko vs. Capcom, which was the first game in which she was featured as a 3D polygonal model. Morrigan and Felicia were two particularly hard characters to implement in Marvel vs. Capcom 3 due to their constantly changing forms. An altogether different super deformed style design sprite is used in Super Puzzle Fighter II Turbo and Super Gem Fighter Mini Mix, in the latter of which she has an alternative nurse costume. In Ultimate Marvel vs. Capcom 3 Femme Fatale Pack, which has been also available for free with pre-order from GameStop, Morrigan received a DLC "casual outfit" costume based on her human form from the Darkstalkers games and the anime series.The Femme Fatale Pack: Morrigan , GameSpot, 11/16/2011. Morrigan has several additional alternative costumes in Cross Edge. In Onimusha Soul, she was redesigned to fit its feudal Japan theme. 

Though Morrigan originates from Scotland in the Darkstalkers canon, neither her first nor last name is of Scottish origin. She is named after the Morrígan, an Irish mythological goddess whose name translates to "great queen," while "Aensland" is a nonexistent surname in any Gaelic language, and is possibly a derivative or alternate spelling by Capcom of the Scottish surname Ainsley. A nod was made to this by Capcom in their 2005 action game Devil May Cry 3: Dante's Awakening wherein a devil woman named Nevan (a Japanese transliteration of "Nemain") is able to manipulate bats; in some versions of Celtic mythology, Nemain was one of the aspects of the Morrígan.

Gameplay
Morrigan's "Soul Fist" special move (a giant flaming skull projectile) is very similar to the iconic "Hadouken" fireball from Street Fighter. She is noted to be easy to use and her "Valkyrie Turn" is an especially damaging special move, but is difficult to connect. Her other specials include "Shadow Blade", "Vector Drain", "Shell Kick", "Vernier Dash", "Soul Eraser" and "Darkness Illusion". Sega Saturn Magazine wrote about Morrigan in Night Warriors: Darkstalkers' Revenge: "Those thinking that Demitri was the Ryu of the [game] should consider Morrigan to be distinctly Ken-like, as she imitates [his] Dragon Punch expertly ... Easy to use, and with a Valkyrie Turn that'll inflict more damage than you thought possible (despite being difficult to connect), Morrigan remains a firm Saturn Mag favourite, not least because of her costume change cheat [code]." MAXIMUM opined Morrigan is "a particularly flexible character" whose "speed and power will often overcome the toughest of enemies. That coupled with a special attack that inflicts up to 17 hits on its own makes her a powerful adversary." According to the Sega Saturn Magazine guide to Darkstalkers 3, her "Dragon Punch ripoffs and fast fireballs put her in the Ryu clone corner, but her flight powers, speed and strength make Morrigan the equal of [the game's boss] Jedah. More powerful than her sister and faster than Demitri, this she-vampire is awesome." EGM2 called Morrigan in Pocket Fighter a "well-balanced character," having good Supers with "a lot of hits" and "decent" flash combos. Spanish edition of Official Dreamcast Magazine opined Morrigan in Marvel vs. Capcom 2 is "skillful and strong, but doesn't stand out in any way. The Soul Eraser is her best attack, although the rest of Hyper Combos are not bad." In the original Marvel vs. Capcom, Morrigan calls upon Lilith to perform her Hyper Combo "Silhouette Blade". In Marvel vs. Capcom 3, this is replaced by "Shadow Servant", where Morrigan a split version of Morrigan copies all of the attacks of the original one. She also summons Lilith for her Marvel vs. Capcom Hyper Combo "Eternal Slumber" wherein Morrigan seduces her opponent behind a stage curtain.

Other appearances
Other media
The 1997 anime OVA series Night Warriors: Darkstalkers' Revenge features Morrigan like her game appearances, portraying her as an idle rich member of a royal family who is more interested in going to Earth than in her duties. She often leaves at will out of mere boredom, much to the frustration of her guardians, elder men of the Aensland family. Her father, Belial, is not mentioned. Princess Morrigan is shown fighting the werewolf Jon Talbain in the opening of the first three episodes. She seeks to battle the vampire lord Demitri Maximoff when he attempts to return to Makai, but their duel with erotic undertones is interrupted when they are sensed by Huitzil. In the final episode, Morrigan goes to Earth after Demitri was bested by Pyron and she encounters him unconscious in the ruins of his castle. Demitri suddenly awakens and attempts to vampirise Morrigan, but she does not resist, much to his surprise. Morrigan tells Demitri that he may become the leader of Makai after all, since a change of leadership is needed to help its current disarray from falling into destruction. They both later observe Donovan's victory over Pyron. The anime's Morrigan was voiced by Rei Sakuma and dubbed into English by Kathleen Barr.

In the UDON Comics series Darkstalkers, Morrigan is portrayed as a malevolent, evil and amoral succubus like the games, who wants nothing more than to visit the human world to eat human souls and dreams, and completely ignores her duty as future ruler of the Makai Realm. Morrigan's attitude annoys her father Belial and gets her two servants, Lucien and Mudo, into trouble. Eventually she hears of Demitri's restoration, and goes to her father to warn him, only to find that he is about to die. She takes on the responsibility that she has often put aside and returns to the human world to fight Demitri, and prove herself worthy of the Makai Realm and the power that Belial sealed away many years ago. In the special issue Morrigan vs Demitri, it is implied that had Belial not sealed away her power, Morrigan might have evolved into a being similar to Pyron and destroyed the Earth and Makai. In the comics, Morrigan's bats are the souls of her human victims, which are not destroyed but remain alive inside her body in a state of eternal bliss and pleasure after she drains them. Aside from consuming souls, Morrigan has no qualms about murdering and taking advantage on humans yet despite this, she sees herself as simply taking people's souls in exchange for eternal bliss." She is also prominently featured in the followup series Darkstalkers: The Night Warriors, in which she, Demitri, Donovan, and Pyron all fight each other. In the later crossover series Street Fighter vs Darkstalkers, Morrigan keeps killing humans until she meets Lilith and finds out about Jedah's plan. Together with her enemy Chun-Li, as well as other uneasy allies, Morrigan and Lilith fight and defeat Jedah, and then they merge, finally restoring Morrigan to her full power. Despite everything she's done, Morrigan gets away with her crimes and is crowned queen of Makai.

Morrigan also appears in the comedic Darkstalkers drama CDs Vampire Knight (ヴァンパイア・ナイト), Darkness Mission (ダークネスミッション) and Dengeki CD Bunko EX: Vampire (電撃CD文庫EX ヴァンパイア), voiced by Rei Sakuma, Kikuko Inoue and Yumi Tōma, as well as in multiple yonkoma parody comics for that were largely compiled from fan submissions. She is often a lead character in various adaptations of Darkstalkers, such as the 1995 manga anthology Dark Angel (闇天使) and Akihiko Ureshino's series of gaiden novels, in particular in 1995's Witch of the Crimson Moon (紅い月の魔女) and 1996's Where the Souls Go (魂の還るところ). Morrigan stars in Run Ishida's 1996 manga which was published in English by Viz Comics in two different versions in 1998 and 2000 as Night Warriors: Darkstalkers' Revenge, spending the entire second half of the 2000 tradeback edition fighting Donovan, as well as in Mami Itou's 1997 Darkstalkers/Red Earth: Maleficarum, a Red Earth crossover manga published in English by UDON Comics in 2010 and was re-released in Japan in 2015. Hiroaki Wakamiya's 1996 manga Victor: Messenger of Doomsday (終末の使者 ビクトル) has Morrigan use her secret identity human persona of the biotechnology researcher Professor Mori to study the human world.

In the U.S. made non-canon cartoon series Darkstalkers, Morrigan was redesigned as character and changed into a villain, voiced by Saffron Henderson. Morrigan's character in the cartoon is jealous, rude, power-hungry and despising humans, especially men. She is implied to actually eat her victims and stated to be a direct descendant of the evil sorceress Morgan le Fay (with the series' protagonist, an original character named Harry Grimoire, being a descendant of Merlin). Her appearance was also altered, making her look slightly older and wear a less revealing costume; GamesRadar commented USA "gave her a look more appropriate for the Wicked Witch of the West than a sexy, soul-sucking, battle-loving demon."

Merchandise
Scores of various figures and statuettes of Morrigan were produced by different manufacturers. These include the figures released by Capcom themselves, Bandai, Banpresto, Diamond Select Toys, E246, Epoch, HBC-Brote, Heihachi Zazen, Kotobukiya, Kurushima, Marvel, Max Factory, Mersa, Moby Dick, Modeler's High, Oonishi Kouji, OOXOO, Organic, Pop Culture Shock Collectibles, SOTA Toys, Yamato, Yoiko, and Yujin, among many others.

Other Morrigan-themed merchandise include Capcom's wall scrolls and posters, T-shirts, covers, a large microfiber towel, and so forth. She is very prominently featured in various Darkstalkers art books, including adorning the covers of UDON-published books Darkstalkers Graphic File, Darkstalkers Tribute, and Darkstalkers Official Complete Works, as well as in the collectible card game Universal Fighting System for which the starter set Morrigan Collector's Tin was released in 2014.

Cultural impact
According to Kotaku's Mike Fahey in 2012, "Morrigan Aensland from Capcom's Darkstalkers is one of the most widely depicted characters in video games. Her distinctive features have spawned dozens of statues, hundreds of cosplays and thousands of pieces of fan art." In anime series Ultimate Girls, the character Tsubomi makes an appearance dressed up as Morrigan. Morrigan has featured in many doujinshi unofficial self-published content, including erotic comics such as Hiroaki Samura's Night of the Succubus (サッカバスの夜) and pornographic films like Layers Cute Hard: Yuuna. One of the color palettes of the fighting game Skullgirls character Ms. Fortune is a homage to Morrigan.

According to Kotaku's Brian Ashcraft in 2012, "Since debuting in 1994's Darkstalkers: The Night Warriors, Morrigan Aensland has become one of gaming's most iconic characters. A fan service favorite, Morrigan continues to attract cosplayers, eager to put on succubus's revealing outfit." Already in 1996, Capcom's representatives were quoted as saying: "If we add female characters, it is very popular. Have you ever been to the  show in Japan? People dress up as Morrigan or Felicia to [costume-]play the games." Helen McCarthy's 2009 book 500 Essential Anime Movies: The Ultimate Guide cited Morrigan as an example of the popularity of the Darkstalkers character designs, with fans frequently cosplaying as the character at various conventions since the original game's release. In 2010, UGO's Chris Plante called her "Darkstalkers most recognizable character [and] also wildly popular with cosplayers" and French television network TF1 included Morrigan among the sexiest video game characters to cosplay and one of the most charismatic. In GameFront's 2011 article showcasing some of Morrigan (and Lilith) cosplayers, Phil Owen called it "probably the sexiest gallery I’ve ever posted." Destructoid's Brittany Vincent wrote in 2014: "For some, Morrigan Aensland is the face of Darkstalkers. For every cosplayer who runs around in loose-fitting fur as Felicia, there are a hundred Morrigans basking in the glory that only comes from hitting up cons in a winged gymnastics costume." 

Celebrity cosplayers who portrayed Morrigan include the Filipino Alodia Gosiengfiao (one of her favorite costumes), and the Americans Jessica Nigri and Linda "Vampy" Le, who called Morrigan "just damn amazing" as "favorite by far" character and "the epitome of Succubus chic," but noted it was difficult to make.  Another cosplayer, Meg Turney, said she would "love to do Morrigan someday" even as "whoever designed the costume without shoulder straps was either someone who hated cosplayers and wanted them to suffer – or a dude." One famous portrayal of Morrigan was done by Lindze Merritt, who later was hired to portray Morrigan during the official Marvel Vs. Capcom 3 Fight Club event in 2010. Morrigan was the first cosplay of Spanish cosplayer known as "Judy Helsing", who later portrayed Bayonetta for Nintendo in Playboy. 

Reception
Popularity
Morrigan is widely seen as the most iconic character of Darkstalkers, arguably even more than the franchise itself, and one of the most popular female characters of video games in general. In 1996, Mean Machines Sega described her as "one of the most bewitching girl characters ever to appear in gaming, which explains her huge fan base in Japan – comprising men and women!" Morrigan was named the 17th-best character of 1997 by Japanese arcade gaming magazine Gamest, while the Japanese Sega Saturn Magazine ranked her as the seventh-best female character on the Sega Saturn. Later, Japanese magazine Famitsu ranked Morrigan as the 12th-best video game heroine of the 1990s. Morrigan was chosen as one of the 20 "muses" of video games by Brazilian magazine SuperGamePower in 2001. Featuring her and Felicia in their Girls of Gaming special in 2003, play introduced the two are famous for how they "unified the haunting with the erotic, along with previously unseen level of animation and creature design." Kotaku's Luke Plunkett wrote he has "always found Morrigan a fascinating character. Darkstalkers is a fairly obscure series, one which few people will have played on a regular basis, and yet Morrigan is always front and centre when it comes to fan art and cosplay." EGM even reported on a newborn girl given Morrigan's name as a tribute. Tom Goulter of GamesRadar wrote in 2013: "Few characters have consumed as much fan-ink as Darkstalkers seductive succubus and the Street Fighter series' high-kicking bunhead. Both have sustained popularity for decades (Morrigan's 20th anniversary comes next year), and they outlasted countless imitators to become standouts of the Capcom cast." GamesRadar staff included Morrigan among the 30 best characters in the three decades of Capcom's history (since 1983), commenting "it's hard to think of any more famous for their beauty" and noting "she has a deeper backstory than some fan art would lead you to believe." 

According to GameSpot, "Morrigan has been a mainstay in the Capcom crossover fighting games and is definitely a fan favorite." Play featured her in the "Girls of Anime" special, later regretting her absence in Capcom Fighting Evolution in their "Girls of Gaming" special. Crunchyroll's Nate Ming described Morrigan as the "FACE of the series," and GamesTM commented that Capcom's choice of Anakaris instead of Morrigan or Talbain to represent Darkstalkers in the 2005 game Capcom Fighting Jam was "a strange selection, to say the least." Her costume was one of the two added to We Love Golf! by popular vote in a poll among players. Kotaku's Fahey, calling Cross Edge an "RPG fan's wet dream," stated that "a game with Etna and Morrigan together alone is worth eleventy million dollars." In 2010, Game Informer chose Morrigan as one of the twenty Capcom characters they would like to see in a rumored crossover fighting game Namco Vs Capcom, her Namco counterpart being Ivy Valentine. In 2012, Complex ranked the "super sexual but also super deadly" Morrigan as the 13th "most dominant" fighting game character, further including  "Capcom vs. DC Universe" as the third fighting game crossover idea they would like to see the most, for a battle between Morrigan and Wonder Woman. That same year, Lucas Sullivan of GamesRadar ranked her as the fourth-best character in the fighting game genre's history. Obi Anyanwu of Complex placed Morrigan ninth in his 2012 list of video game characters that deserve a spin-off and Mike Andronico of Gamenguide named her as number one "fiercest female in today's fighting games" who "has stood the test of time as one of fighting games' most iconic faces" by 2013. In 2016, Crunchyroll's Brittany Vincent described Morrigan as "a perennial Darkstalkers favorite, and for good reason. She's gorgeous, powerful, and all-around awesome."

Sex appeal
Morrigan was often noted as one of the most sexy characters of fighting games and gaming in general. In 2003, GameSpy's Bryan Johnson ranked this "embodiment of sexual temptation" as the third top "babe in games", calling her and Capcom's answer to SNK's Mai Shiranui. GameDaily placed Morrigan number nine on their 2008 list of "hottest game babes", while UGO ranked Morrigan fourth in their 2011 list of the "foxiest fighting females to ever be pixelated." GameFront staff featured her twice on their 2011 list of "greatest boobs in video game history", at 37th (for the Darkstalkers version, called the "reason 12-year-olds packed arcades into the late '90s") and 11th (for the Marvel Vs. Capcom version, being "50% of all Comic Con costumes"), while China's NetEase put Morrigan at fifth spot on their list of top ten big-chested "sex goddesses" in video games. Morrigan's breasts were also ranked as the eight-best in gaming history by Rich Shivener of Joystick Division that same year, with Italian edition of Tom's Games ranking Morrigan's cleavages as the second-best neckline in video game history in 2012, as well included among "the hottest video game breasts of all time" by Playboy. In 2012, Morrigan was ranked as the "third-hottest" character video game history by Larry Hester of Complex, as the fifth-sexiest woman in video games by Spanish IGN, and as the "17th-hottest" female video game character by Kristie Bertucci of Gadget Review, In 2013, Scott Marley of Daily Record declared Morrigan the eighth-most attractive female video game character, and Steve Jenkins of CheatCodes.com ranked her as the "seventh-hottest video game girl" of all time. She was included among the "old school hotties that still got it" by Travis Hubert of Cheat Code Central in 2014, Similarly, Vietnam's Thanh Niên ranked her as the seventh-most sexy female video game character in 2015.

UGO included Morrigan on their 2008 list of 11 "hottest babes to ever hit the video game world," stating that "one thing that video game babes have over the real-life variety is that it's much easier for a girl who's made of pixels to rock an absolutely ludicrous outfit and still look hot ... she doesn't look a year of her 300, and her appearances across the Capcom fighting franchises prove that the company has an excellent eye for the female form," as well as in the 2011 list of fifty "hottest girls in games". In 2009, Gelo Gonzales of Filipino FHM listed the "undeniably seductive" Morrigan among the nine sexiest "bad girls of videogame land", while Manolith included her on their top lists of "sexiest video game women" and "hottest female video game protagonists".The Manolith Team, 25 Hottest Female Video Game Protagonists, Manolith, 9 December 2009. Johnny Firecloud of CraveOnline featured this "iconic succubus" on his 2010 list of ten "hottest video game girls of all time", commenting that she "is more than just an anatomic wonder – she's also one of the single most sexually stylistic ladies in gaming land." Japanator.com's Bob Muir included her on the list of "Japanese gaming's top ten hottest girls", stating: "In fact, Morrigan is so popular that many people know of her sultry looks who have never touched a Darkstalkers game."  In 2012, she was listed as one of ten sexiest video game characters by Fernando DaQuino of Tecmundo, MSN Malaysia included this "shameless succubus" among the twenty "hottest women in video game history", and UGO included her among the 99 "hottest" fictional women of the year, calling her inclusion the best thing about Marvel Vs. Capcom 3. John Corpuz of Tom's Guide included her on his 2013's list of twenty "hottest video game babes" and stated that "when it comes to 90s fighting games, Darkstalkers’ Morrigan is the definitive poster girl." A poll for the most erotic girl in the history of fighting games conducted by Japanese web portal Goo had had Morrigan take the fourth place out of 50 contesters in 2016; she was later voted the third in a 2018 poll.

Other reception
In 2008, Morrigan was included on a list of top "chicks behaving badly" by IGN's Scott Cullura for her "penchant for magic and kick-ass fighting moves," her outfit described as "one that would make even Jenna Jameson blush." While Zoomin Games named her costume as the second-most sexy outfit in games, Charlie Barratt of GamesRadar cited Morrigan as one example of what they considered "the most shameless—and least surprising—character cliché of all time" which is "the half-naked woman." Morrigan was featured in a list of ten "babes who shouldn't meet your mom" by GameDaily in 2008, as well as in a list of ten "game girls you wouldn't dare to date" by Virgin Media in 2010. In 2011, Rich Knight of Complex pitted her against Agent Rayne in the "battle of the beauties" feature, comparing them to "the sexy goth girls you were too afraid to ask out in high school" and choosing Morrigan, but Richard Coombs of Blistered Thumbs ranked her as number one video game woman "you wouldn’t want to be with" as "that would probably be the scariest romance you could ever be in." Complex featured "Morrigan's bloodlust" on their list of "14 aspects of our perfect Valentine—one video game girl at a time" to build a perfect woman on Valentine's Day 2012. Game Revolution included an alleged rumor of Morrigan's romance with Nintendo's Princess Daisy in their 2014 April Fools' Day feature.

Despite her popularity, Morrigan, along with the Darkstalkers cast in general, has not been as well-received for her presence in the 1995 cartoon series. Rachel Jagielski of VentureBeat described her as the otherwise "normally sensual succubus" who "looked, if not terrible, really boring" in the show. Ryan Winterhalter of GamesRadar called the character "old and creepy," and Hardcore Gaming 101 opined she "look[ed] frightening in most close-ups." 411mania.com called this version of Morrigan "awful" and her Scottish accent therein "inappropriately wrong", castigating the show itself as "the worst video game cartoon in history". The anime version has been received much better; for instance, Bryn Williams of Gamers' Republic'' chose the "extremely erotic" scene of Morrigan taking a bath as the "highlight moment" in his review of the third episode.
Her comic version has been received badly by fans, mostly because of her unfaithful and infamous portrayal in the comics.

See also

List of Darkstalkers characters
List of succubi in fiction

Notes

References

External links

 Official websites: Vampire Resurrection, Marvel vs. Capcom Infinite 
 Morrigan's Darkstalkers and Marvel vs. Capcom 2 entries at StrategyWiki.org

Adoptee characters in video games
Capcom protagonists
Darkstalkers characters
Deity characters in video games
Demon characters in video games
Female characters in anime and manga
Female characters in video games
Fictional bisexual females
Fictional British people in video games
Fictional characters who can duplicate themselves
Fictional half-demons
Princess characters in video games
Fictional Scottish people
Fictional succubi
LGBT characters in video games
Shapeshifter characters in video games
Twin characters in video games
Queen characters in video games
Video game characters introduced in 1994
Video game characters who can teleport
Video game characters who use magic
Video game characters with slowed ageing
Video game mascots
Woman soldier and warrior characters in video games
Fictional people from the 17th-century